George Underhill House, also known as Wayside, is a historic home located at Locust Valley in Nassau County, New York, USA. It is a rambling U-shaped wood-frame house with 1-, - and 2-story sections dated to about 1790. The original section is a -story timber-frame structure with a moderately pitched gable roof. Also on the property is a -story, wood-frame tenant house.

It was listed on the National Register of Historic Places in 2003.

References

Houses on the National Register of Historic Places in New York (state)
Houses completed in 1790
Houses in Nassau County, New York
National Register of Historic Places in Nassau County, New York